The Sigma 18-50mm 2.8 EX DC Macro is a wide to normal angle, zoom lens made by the Sigma Corporation.

The lens is produced in Canon EF mount, Four Thirds System, Nikon F-mount, Pentax K mount, the SA mount, and the Sony/Minolta AF Mount varieties, all have the same optical formula.

The lens is designed for digital crop DSLR with an APS-C sized sensor. Because of this, if the lens is used on a non-crop body, such as a Nikon D700, it will cause significant mechanical vignetting. When used on a body with a field of view compensation factor of 2× (Four Thirds body) it provides a field of view equivalent to a 36–100mm lens mounted in a 35mm body. In a 1.6× body, such as the Canon EOS 450D, it provides a less narrow field of view, equivalent to a 29–80mm lens mounted on a 35mm frame body. With a 1.5× body such as the Nikon D300, it provides a less narrow field of view, equivalent to a 27–75mm lens mounted on a 35mm frame body.

Technical information
The 18–50mm 2.8 EX DC Macro is a consumer-level lens. It is constructed with a plastic body and a metal mount. The lens features a distance window with depth of field scale. A 7-blade, maximum aperture of 2.8 gives the lens the ability to create depth of field effects. The optical construction of the lens contains 15 lens elements, including two aspherical lens elements, one SLD (Special Low Dispersion) element, and one ELD (Extraordinary Low Dispersion) element. The lens uses an internal focusing system, powered by a micro motor. Auto focus speed of this lens is moderate, but because of its focal length, auto focus time is not long. The front of the lens does not rotate, but the focusing ring does, when using auto focus. The lens uses an extending inner lens barrel when zooming; this allows a more compact design, and does not rotate while zooming.

HSM variant 
In 2007, Sigma released a HSM version of the 18–50mm 2.8 EX DC Macro, called the 18–50mm 2.8 EX DC Macro HSM. This lens is available for Nikon F-mount only. The lens has the same optical formula as the non-HSM lens, but is 0.5 mm shorter, and 85 g (18.9 oz.) heavier. The lens has a closer minimum focus distance of 20 cm, but because of the larger Nikon DX sensor size, the magnification rating is still 1:3. Also because of larger sensor size, the stated angle of view is 76.5°–31.7°, though these angles are still obtainable on the non-HSM version.

See also
List of Nikon compatible lenses with integrated autofocus-motor

References

External links

018−050mm f 2.8 EX DC Macro
Camera lenses introduced in 2006